Kruishoutem (in French and English Cruyshautem) is a village and was a municipality located in the Belgian province of East Flanders. The municipality comprised the towns of Kruishoutem proper, Nokere and Wannegem-Lede. In January 2018, the municipality of Kruishoutem had a total population of 8,086. The total area is 46.76 km2. On 1 January 2019, Kruishoutem and Zingem merged into the new municipality of Kruisem.

The SONS Museum is located in Kruisem.

Notable people
 Charles Louis Spilthoorn (Spilthooren), born 12 October 1804 in Kruishoutem ; died 12 September 1872 in Brussels, lawyer and politician.
 Henry Gabriëls, born in Wannegem-Lede on 6 October 1838, professor & rector in Saint Joseph's Seminary in Troy, New York ; bishop of Ogdensburg, New York, until his death in 1921. Created Sanatorium Gabriels and town Gabriels, New York.
 Adolf Daens, priest in Kruishoutem in 1878–1879, later member of the Parliament.

Gallery

References

External links

Official website 

 
Former municipalities of East Flanders
Kruisem
Populated places in East Flanders